Oryzihumus soli is a Gram-positive and aerobic bacterium species from the genus Oryzihumus which has been isolated from the lawn of Seoul National University in Korea.

References

External links
Type strain of Oryzihumus soli at BacDive -  the Bacterial Diversity Metadatabase

Intrasporangiaceae
Bacteria described in 2017